Italian submarine Axum was an  built in the 1930s, serving in the Regia Marina during World War II. She was named after an ancient city of Axum in Ethiopia.

Design and description
The Adua-class submarines were essentially repeats of the preceding . They displaced  surfaced and  submerged.

For surface running, the boats were powered by two  diesel engines, each driving one propeller shaft. When submerged each propeller was driven by a  electric motor. They could reach  on the surface and  underwater.

The boats were armed with six internal  torpedo tubes, four in the bow and two in the stern. They were also armed with one  deck gun for combat on the surface. The light anti-aircraft armament consisted of one or two pairs of   machine guns.

Construction and career

Axum was built at the CRDA shipyard, in Monfalcone. She was laid down on 8 February 1936, launched on 27 September of the same year, and commissioned on 2 December 1936.  On March 20, 1937 after a brief training, she was assigned to 23rd Submarine Squadron in Naples.

Between August 27 and September 5, 1937 she performed a secret mission on behalf of the Spanish Nationalists in the Strait of Sicily but did not detect any targets.

Between 1937 and 1940 the submarine underwent intensive training out of her base in Naples. In 1940 Axum was assigned to 71st Squadron (VII Submarine Group) in Cagliari, but her operational base continued to be Naples. After Italy's entrance into World War II she was mainly operating in the western Mediterranean.

In June 1940 she was deployed south of Sardinia.

On 4–5 July 1940 Axum patrolled of the coast of northern Algeria. On 9–11 July 1940 she was relocated to patrol off the island of La Galite, then moved southwest of the island of Sant'Antioco.

In the afternoon of November 9, 1940 Axum left Cagliari and was sent to patrol off the island of La Galite along with four other submarines (including Alagi and Aradam) as a screen to the British Operation "Coat". Later the same day, shortly after 19:00, she detected engine noises but the distance was far too great to attempt an attack. On November 12, 1940, she again detected weak noises through her hydrophones, but again the distant was far too great to attempt an attack.

On November 27, 1940, while patrolling south of Sardinia, at 21:35 she sighted three destroyers and submerged to avoid detection.

In January 1941 she was deployed to the coast of Algeria and Tunisia.

On June 16, 1941, Axum, under command of captain Emilio Gariazzo, was sent to patrol between Ras Uleima, and Marsa Matruh to prevent coastal bombardments by British naval ships conducted in support British troops retreat.

On June 20, 1941, received orders to move closer to Benghazi. On June 23, 1941, around 22:26 she sighted a ship heading west and launched a torpedo, but it missed due to irregular running. Axum launched a second torpedo, but it also missed the ship, passing a few meters by the stern. The ship returned fire and the submarine was forced to dive and get through a brief but intense depth charge attack, without suffering any damage.

During 19–28 July 1941 she got on patrol off Tobruk and detected intense aerial and naval activity, but there were no attacks.

After that Axum was relocated to Leros. Upon arrival and surfacing, she was mistaken for an enemy submarine, and a MAS boat attacked her with machine guns and a torpedo. Fortunately, Axum was not hit, and no one was wounded or killed.

Subsequently, she was transferred first to Messina, and then in September to Cagliari.

In September 1941 Axum was deployed to an area east of Balearic Islands and south of Menorca together with three other submarines (Aradam, Diaspro and Serpente) to intercept British ships during Operation Halberd, but British ships did not pass through her area of operation.

On October 24, 1941, she patrolled in the waters of Malta.

In December 1941 she patrolled in the area off Cape Bougaroun.

On January 4, 1942 Axum was deployed to an area south of Malta with the task of detecting and attacking any British naval forces, but no sightings were made.

In February 1942 she patrolled off the coast of Algeria.

In mid-June 1942 she was deployed in the Ionian Sea, then transferred to patrol northwest of Algiers. On June 22, 1942
she was transferred to patrol off Linosa.

In July 1942 Axum, under command of captain Renato Ferrini, was on patrol between the island of Cani and the island of La Galite, and in the late afternoon of July 15, six miles east of the Cani Island, sighted  moving rapidly in the direction of Malta. At 20:00, Axum launched three electric torpedoes, but failed to hit the ship because of the bad weather and rough seas.

In mid-August 1942, Axum was assigned with many other submarines to intercept a British convoy, part of Operation Pedestal. 
Altogether, fifteen Italian submarines and two German U-Boots were deployed in the western Mediterranean with the orders to attack any enemy ship greater than a destroyer. On August 11, 1942, the submarine, commanded by  captain Renato Ferrini, left Cagliari heading to an area 25 miles northwest of Cape Blanc, where he arrived the following day. At 6:00 on August 12, Axum left his assigned area, and at 14:00 Commander Ferrini, believing that the convoy would be going a lot closer to the coast, keeping their escorts to the north, ordered full ahead towards Cape Blanc while under water. At 18:21 a silhouette of the convoy was observed. At 18:40 Axum observed fumes on the right which were produced by the anti-aircraft guns engaging two airplanes. Axum continued her approach, and at 19:27, she observed through a periscope that the convoy about eight kilometers to her left. At 19:37 a new observation showed that the distance had dropped to 4,000 meters, and convoy was moving at 13 knots. Another periscope observation was done at 19:48, and a cruiser was selected as a target, and at 19:55, from an estimated distance of 1,300 meters from the first row of the convoy and 1,800 meters from the target cruiser, Axum launched a salvo of all four torpedoes: first was sent straight, second, 5° to the right, third 5° to the left, and finally last one, straight. Immediately Axum disengaged. 63 seconds after the launch, an explosion was heard, after 27 more seconds, two more, one after another. Captain Ferrini thought he had hit a ship in the first row and another one in the second row, but in reality three ships were hit.

The first torpedo struck modern light cruiser , flagship of Admiral Harold Burrough (Commander of Force X), moving at 14 knots. The explosion opened a 30-foot-wide hole, knocking out electricals, flooding the boiler rooms and knocking out pumps, and starting fires on board. Fifty-two crew members lost their lives. The ship started listing to port (i.e. to the left), but the crew managed to stabilize the cruiser and was able to turn around and head to Gibraltar accompanied by three destroyers. Admiral Burrough had to be taken off the cruiser and moved on board of destroyer .  safely made it back to Gibraltar, where she stayed for over a year undergoing repairs returning to action in September 1943.

Two torpedoes then struck  moving at 8 knots, blowing off the stern with one of the propellers, killing 24 crew members.

Finally, the fourth torpedo struck tanker , causing heavy damage. It was probably the most important merchant ship of the convoy, being the only oil tanker carrying fuel for Malta. Within twenty minutes, the tanker's crew was able to extinguish the fires and continue at 13 knots despite damage. The ship was hit by several bombs on her journey, but the superhuman determination of her crew, and support of several destroyers that guarded her, allowed SS Ohio to reach Malta on 15 August 1942. After unloading fuel, SS Ohio finally sank, breaking in two in Malta's harbor.

After four and half minutes after torpedo launch, escorts went on offensive. Axum was at 65 meters when the depth charge attack started, and captain Ferrini took the boat down to 100 meters. The hunt continued for roughly 2 hours and 60 depth charges were thrown. At 22:50 Axum surfaced to observe the damage and assess the situation. Noting enemy's destroyers in the distance, Axum submerged and went north. She surfaced again at 1:30 on August 14. The damage sustained by the submarine prevented her from diving below 40 meters; nevertheless, Axum stayed in the area patrolling for the next 2 days, and returned to Trapani on August 15, 1942, at 19:30.

In October and November 1942 she patrolled off Balearic Islands. On November 7, 1942, she sighted enemy ships, but got detected and had to dive and withstand a barrage of depth charges which caused some damage. On November 9 Axum left the patrol area and headed back to the base due to sustained damage.

In February 1943 she patrolled in the Gulf of Sirte but did not encounter any traffic.

On April 11, 1943, while sailing in a violent storm off the coast of Sardinia, sustained flooding and lost the use of both of her periscopes forcing her to abandon her mission and return to the base.

On July 21, 1943 Axum while proceeding from La Spezia to La Maddalena, was spotted in the position , five miles northwest of Calvi, by the British Submarine . Templar fired a total of seven torpedoes over the course of several attacks but they all missed the target.

At the announcement of the armistice, on September 8, 1943 Axum (under command of captain Vittorio Barra) was in Gaeta to carry out repair work on diesel engines. Early on September 9, 1943, Germans tried to capture ships in the harbor, and at 2:15 Axum managed to get away with only one engine running. Captain Barra took the boat to island of Montecristo where the submarine spent a night. On September 10, 1943, she reached Portoferraio, and from there proceeded to Palermo.

After repairs in Palermo, she sailed to Malta. On October 9, 1943, she left Malta for Taranto where she underwent further repairs including to her second engine. For the rest of the war, Axum was used only to infiltration missions (bringing and taking spies and sabotage teams from German-occupied territories). During one of those missions, on December 25, 1943 Axum, under command of captain Giovanni Sorrentino, left Taranto to recover spies from the Gulf of Kyparissia. In the evening of December 27, Axum arrived at the rendezvous point on the west coast of Morea. While waiting for a sailboat to bring back the spies, Axum was drifting towards the coast when she ran aground on unknown rock formation. All efforts to dislodge the submarine failed, so in the afternoon of December 28, 1943 commander Sorrentino ordered the boat scuttled with explosive charges at Kaiafas beach, in the position . The submarine crew and the spies had to spend a month in Morea mountains. Finally, at the end of January 1944, the crew and the spies were picked off Marathopolis (now part of Gargalianoi), near Proti Island by escort .

Notes

References 
 

Adua-class submarines
World War II submarines of Italy
Lost submarines of Italy
Maritime incidents in December 1943
World War II shipwrecks in the Mediterranean Sea
1936 ships
Ships built by Cantieri Riuniti dell'Adriatico